This is a list of diplomatic missions in Burkina Faso. At present, the capital city of Ouagadougou hosts 32 embassies. Several other countries have ambassadors accredited to Burkina Faso, with most being resident elsewhere in western Africa.

Embassies 
Ouagadougou

 (to open)

Consulates

Consulate-General in Ouagadougou

Other posts in Ouagadougou 
 (Delegation)

Non-resident embassies 

 (Algiers)
 (Lagos)
 (Abuja)
 (Accra)
 (Dakar)
 (Dakar)
 (Moscow)
 (Algiers)
 (Accra)
 (Abuja)
 (Abidjan)
 (Abidjan)
 (Abidjan)
 (Dakar)
 (Paris)
 (Accra)
 (Rabat)
 (Tripoli)
 (Accra)
 (Accra)
 (Abidjan)
 (London)
 (Lagos)
 (Abidjan)
 (Algiers)
 (New York City)
 (Abuja)
 (Abidjan)
 (Dakar)
 (Abuja)
 (Bamako)
 (Paris)
 (Lagos)
 (Abuja)
 (Accra)
 (Bamako)
 (Paris)
 (Abidjan)
 (Algiers)
 (Accra)
 (Dakar)
 (Brussels)
 (Abidjan)
 (Paris)
 (Abidjan)
 (London)
 (Dakar)
 (New York City)
 (Dakar)
 (Bamako)
 (Abuja)
 (Abidjan)
 (Dakar)
 (New York City)
 (Cairo)
 (Algiers)
 (Abuja)
 (Bamako)
 (Abuja)
 (Dakar)
 (Algiers)
 (Algiers)
 (Paris)
 (Bamako)
 (Dakar)
 (Abidjan)
 (Abidjan)
 (New York)
 (Abuja)
 (Abidjan)
 (Accra)
 (Abidjan)
 (Abidjan)
 (Lagos)
 (Abidjan)
 (Lagos)
 (Dakar)
 (Abuja)
 (Accra)
 (Bamako)
 (Paris)
 (Cairo)
 (Paris)
 (Moscow)
 (Abuja)
 (Accra)
 (Paris)
 (Rabat)
 (Algiers)

Closed missions

References

External links
 Ouagadougou Diplomatic List (in French)

 
Burkina Faso
Diplomatic missions